The name Siguenza or Sigüenza (the Spanish original spelling) can refer to:
The Spanish city Sigüenza and the nearby Paredes de Sigüenza
A family of Spanish origin, including the following notable individuals:
Carlos de Sigüenza y Góngora, Mexican colonial officer, author and polymath 
 Herbert Siguenza, actor
Peter C. Siguenza, Guam's former Chief Justice
 Ruben Siguenza, bassist in the band Mink DeVille